Tanya Myshkin (born 21 August 1961) is an Australian printmaker, born in Adelaide, South Australia but primarily based in Canberra. She is primarily known for her engraving and printmaking works, such as June Lombard, and Dried Mouse. Much of her work is centred around the Australian landscape and culture, and based on Australian textiles such as Eucalyptus Camaldulensis.

Her works have been shown in major galleries including the National Gallery of Australia, and her livres d'artiste have been acquired by the British Library, Queensland State Library and the Australian National University Library.

Background 
Myshkin attended the Canberra School of Art from 1989, studying under Gillian Mann and Jorg Schmeisser. In 1996 she was an Artist in Residence in the Edition and Artist Book Studio with Dianne Fogwell and Petr Herel.

Exhibitions 

 Art for Life: Studio One Gallery (1991-1991)
 Figurative: An Exhibition of Prints. (1992-1992)
 Memorandum: High Court of Australia

References 

1961 births
Living people
Australian artists
Australian printmakers
Australian engravers